Herrö, or Herrön, is an island in the southern part of Stockholm archipelago, which forms part of Nynäshamn Municipality, Stockholm County, Sweden.

Herrö is connected to the neighbouring islands of Himmelso and Yxlö by road bridge, and Himmelso is in turn connected to the mainland by a further bridge.

External links 
 

Islands of Nynäshamn Municipality
Islands of the Stockholm archipelago
Populated places in Nynäshamn Municipality